Twentytwo in Blue is the second studio album by American indie rock band Sunflower Bean. It was released on March 23, 2018 under Lucky Number in the UK and Mom + Pop Music worldwide.

Release
The first single "I Was A Fool" was released on November 3, 2017. Guitarist Nick Kivlen explained the song "seemingly crept up from nowhere and into our practice space. It was a special moment between the three of us, Julia and I both improvised the lyrics."

The second single "Crisis Fest" was released on January 12, 2018, along with the announcement of their second album.

On February 23, 2018, the third single "Twentytwo" was released.

The fourth single "Human For" was released on March 16, 2018.

Critical reception
Twentytwo in Blue was met with "generally favorable" reviews from critics. At Metacritic, which assigns a weighted average rating out of 100 to reviews from mainstream publications, this release received an average score of 78, based on 20 reviews. Aggregator Album of the Year gave the release a 76 out of 100 based on a critical consensus of 24 reviews.

Tim Sendra from AllMusic said the band "don't pull any punches and the record has an immediate impact, both sonically and emotionally. About half the record sounds like the work of a road-tested, whip-smart rock & roll band," while noting the album fits "together perfectly; from the songs to the sounds to the performances, it's indie rock and pop at their thoughtful, searching, sweet, and punchy best." Alex McLevy from The A.V. Club said the album is "tighter in execution, broader in scope, and more pop-focused in nearly every way. Taken as a collection, it sounds like a jukebox full of lost ’70s hits." In a review published by Clash, Aurora Henni Krogh said "Sunflower Bean have found a maturity and a balance between lyrics and melody that infatuates. Though they sometimes still miss, 'Twentytwo In Blue' stakes out the loss of innocence that comes with growing up, and it does it beautifully."

Accolades

Year-end lists

Mid-year lists

Decade lists

Track listing

Charts

Personnel

Musicians
 Julia Cumming – lead vocals, bass
 Nick Kivlen – guitar
 Olive Faber – drums

Production
 Joe LaPorta – mastering
 Jarvis Taveniere – engineer
 Matthew Molnar – producer
 Jacob Portrait – mixing, producer
 Rachel Cabitt – layout

Release history

References

2018 albums
Mom + Pop Music albums
Indie rock albums by American artists